Phan Thị Vàng Anh (another pen name Thảo Hảo; born 18 August 1968) is a Vietnamese poet and short-story writer. She was one of the Vietnamese writers that emerged from post-Vietnam War literature.

Early life
Vàng Anh was born in 1968 in Hanoi, Vietnam. Her father and mother were, respectively, Chế Lan Viên, a poet who composed on philosophical questions dealing with the occult and life, and Vũ Thị Thường, a novelist. Vang-Anh's inspirations mostly came from her parents' literary influences.

Themes 
The themes that Anh covers in her works are about family, life, friendship, love, and coming of age, about which she writes in a simple style. Her works are read by different generations of readers due to the relatable characters written in her stories.

Selected works 
Truyện trẻ con (children's story) (9/1988)
Hoa muộn (Late Flowers) (1993)
Khi người ta trẻ (When We Are Young) (1994)
Pantomime (1994)
Mưa rơi (Rain) (1994)
Hội chợ (Market Days) (1995)

References 

Vietnamese women writers
Vietnamese women short story writers
Vietnamese short story writers
People from Hanoi
1968 births
Living people
Vietnamese women poets
21st-century Vietnamese women